Saldi Amiruddin (born 9 March 1995) is an Indonesian professional footballer who plays as a winger for Liga 2 club Bekasi City.

Club career

Madura United
He started playing professionally with Liga 1 club Madura United in 2017. Saldi made his league debut on 16 April 2017 in a match against Bali United at the Gelora Ratu Pamelingan Stadium, Pamekasan.

PSM Makassar
He transferred to PSM Makassar in 2018 to play in Liga 1. Saldi made his debut on 23 May 2018 in a match against Persib Bandung. On 23 September 2018, Saldi scored his first goal for PSM against Sriwijaya in the 21st minute at the Andi Mattalatta Stadium, Makassar.

PSIM Yogyakarta (loan)
He was signed for PSIM Yogyakarta to play in the Liga 2 in the 2019 season, on loan from PSM Makassar.

Bekasi City
On 6 June 2022, it was announced that Saldi would be joining Bekasi City for the 2022-23 Liga 2 campaign.

Career statistics

Club

References

External links
 Saldi at Soccerway
 Saldi at Liga Indonesia

1995 births
Living people
Indonesian footballers
PSM Makassar players
Association football midfielders
Madura United F.C. players
Sportspeople from South Sulawesi